The 1985 Southland Conference men's basketball tournament was held March 5–7, 1985 with quarterfinal matchups being held at the home arena of the higher seed and the semifinals and championship game played at Thomas Assembly Center in Ruston, Louisiana.

Louisiana Tech defeated  in the championship game, 70–69, to win their second straight Southland men's basketball tournament.

The Bulldogs received a bid to the 1985 NCAA Tournament as No. 5 seed in the Midwest region and advanced to the Sweet Sixteen before losing to No. 4 Oklahoma. They were the only Southland member invited to the tournament.

Format
All seven of the conference's members participated in the tournament field. They were seeded based on regular season conference records, with the top seed earning a bye into the semifinal round. The other six teams began play in the quarterfinal round.

First round games were played at the home court of the higher-seeded team. All remaining games were played at the Thomas Assembly Center in Ruston, Louisiana.

Bracket

References

Southland Conference men's basketball tournament
Tournament
Southland Conference men's basketball tournament
Southland Conference men's basketball tournament
Basketball competitions in Louisiana
Sports in Ruston, Louisiana
College sports tournaments in Louisiana